Eddy Riva (born 17 April 1973 in Thionville, Moselle) is a French race walker.

Achievements

References

1973 births
Living people
People from Thionville
French male racewalkers
Athletes (track and field) at the 2004 Summer Olympics
Athletes (track and field) at the 2008 Summer Olympics
Olympic athletes of France
Sportspeople from Moselle (department)